Orand (also, Orant) is a village and municipality in the Lerik Rayon of Azerbaijan.  It has a population of 1,378.

References 

Populated places in Lerik District